Gerhard Voigt (born 7 August 1904, date of death unknown) was a German rower. He competed in the men's double sculls event at the 1928 Summer Olympics.

References

1904 births
Year of death missing
German male rowers
Olympic rowers of Germany
Rowers at the 1928 Summer Olympics
Sportspeople from Leipzig